Yelena Abdulaevna Khanga, also transliterated as Elena Hanga (born May 1, 1962), is a Russian journalist who was raised in Moscow, USSR, and came to the United States in 1990 to write (with Susan Jacoby) Soul to Soul: The Story of a Black Russian American Family: 1865–1992. Khanga divides her time between New York City and Moscow.

Early life

An only child, Yelena Abdulayevna Khanga was born in Moscow to Abdullah Kassim, the first vice-president of Zanzibar (assassinated in 1967) and Lily Khanga (pronounced Han-ga), a historian and educator (née Golden) who was the daughter of an interracial couple from New York City. Yelena's American maternal grandmother was of Polish-Jewish descent and worked as a Russian-English translator for a Soviet news agency. She also claimed to be a distant relative of the well-known violinist Arnold Steinhardt (her grandmother was the cousin of his father). Her African-American maternal grandfather, Oliver Golden, had a college degree in agronomy from the Tuskegee Institute but was unable to find any work in his field in the USA, and moved to the USSR (Uzbekistan) with his wife in 1931 to develop the cotton industry there.

Personal life
Khanga is a graduate of Moscow State University, which is also the alma mater of her mother, who was the first black student to attend the Russian university. Besides Moscow, Khanga has lived in New York City and Boston, Massachusetts.

Khanga is the aunt of Hungarian basketball player Ádám Hanga.

She has been married to Igor Mintusov, a Russian political analyst/consultant, since January 2002, and they have one daughter, Yelizaveta-Anna Mintusova (born October 25, 2002). The family primarily resides in Moscow but also own a home in New York City, as Khanga has dual citizenship through her American grandparents.

Career
Following graduation from Moscow State University, Khanga was hired by the Moscow News and became the first Russian journalist to participate in a foreign-exchange program with the American-based Christian Science Monitor in 1988. Through this exchange, Khanga became well known in the United States for being a black woman from Russia, with many Americans being shocked that black people even lived in Russia. Khanga was the moderator of the Russian television talk show The Domino Effect. She also moderated  Russia's first talk show about sex, called About That (Pro Eto), from 1997 to 2000, which tackled such matters as HIV/AIDS, homosexuality and workplace sexual harassment; she later commented that the effect of the show "was like a bomb went off".

She was also a performer with a comedy show called Kanotye in Brighton Beach, Brooklyn.

References

External links
Booklist awards
"Black people in Russia - Yelena Khanga", Afro-Europe, February 22, 2011
"Yelena Khanga", Answers.com

1962 births
Living people
Moscow State University alumni
Russian expatriates in the United States
Russian television personalities
Russian people of African-American descent
Russian people of Zanzibari descent
Russian people of Polish-Jewish descent
Russian journalists
Soviet people of African-American descent
Writers from Moscow
Black Jewish people